The Eagle's Perch was an American helicopter that was designed by the Nolan brothers and produced by Eagle's Perch Inc. of Carrollton, Virginia. Now out of production, when it was available the aircraft was supplied as a kit for amateur construction.

Design and development
The design was intended to be a simplified helicopter. Constructed by two brothers with no prior aeronautical experience or skills it employed a unique coaxial, counter-rotating, fixed pitch rotor system with no collective control, but employed a rudder. To account for the fact that the aircraft could not autorotate after a power failure, it was equipped with two engines and could hover on either one. A ballistic parachute was optional.

The Eagle's Perch was designed to comply with the US Experimental - Amateur-built aircraft rules. It featured two coaxial main rotors, a single-seat open cockpit without a windshield, skid-type landing gear and two twin-cylinder, air-cooled, two-stroke, dual-ignition  Hirth 2706 engines.

The aircraft fuselage was made from welded steel tubing. Its  diameter two-bladed rotors were of a fixed pitch design.

The manufacturer estimated the construction time from the supplied kit to be 240 hours.

The design was later developed into the Phoenix Skyblazer.

Operational history
The design won Grand Champion Helicopter at the Popular Rotorcraft Association convention in 1994.

By July 2014 no examples remained registered in the United States with the Federal Aviation Administration and it is unlikely any exist today, although one, the prototype, had been registered at one time.

Specifications (Eagle's Perch)

See also
List of rotorcraft

References

Eagle's Perch
1990s United States sport aircraft
1990s United States helicopters
Homebuilt aircraft
Coaxial rotor helicopters
Twin-engined piston helicopters